A Melody Looking is a Hong Kong musical film written and directed by Leon Lai, released on 18 November 2006.

Synopsis
Sixteen-year-old Jill is a girl searching for her sister Janice, who reportedly possesses the perfect voice. She seeks assistance from a detective named Leon. During their search, Leon and his assistant Charles mix up the twin sisters, leading to a series of unexpected twists.

Cast and characters
 Leon Lai as Leon
 Chapman To as Chapman
 Janice Vidal as Janice
 Charles Ying as Charles
 Jill Vidal as Jill
 Emily Wong as Emily

Background
The film, which cost about HK$ 10 million to produce, was shot entirely in New York City and marks the directorial debut of singer Leon Lai. It marks Leon debut as a director.

See also
Cinema of Hong Kong

References

External links
 
 

2000s Cantonese-language films
Hong Kong musical films
2000s Hong Kong films